The Deans' Cup is an annual charity basketball game between Columbia Law School (CLS) and New York University School of Law (NYU), two of the top law schools in the country.  First held in 2002, the game raises money for public interest and community service organizations at both universities and is sponsored by many large New York City law firms.  A game between faculty members of the two schools is held at halftime.  The game is the single largest law school event in the United States, and has raised more than a half million dollars for public interest foundations at the two law schools.

The 2020 and 2021 editions of the Deans' Cup were canceled due to the COVID-19 pandemic, but the game returned in 2022 and was played at Columbia University's Levien Gymnasium on April 9, 2022. NYU won by a final score of 48-34.

Past results
Venues

 Coles Sports and Recreation Center (NYU)
 Levien Gymnasium (Columbia)

External links
 The Deans' Cup Official Site
 In This Subway Series, NYU Law Vies With Columbia
 CLS Routs NYU For Dean's Cup
NYU Law wins Deans' Cup fifth year in a row

Columbia University
New York University
Recurring sporting events established in 2002
2002 establishments in New York City
Basketball competitions in New York City